Alberto Blanc (10 November 1835, Chambéry – 31 May 1904) was an Italian diplomat and politician. He was minister of foreign affairs of the Kingdom of Italy from 1893 to 1896. He was ambassador to Italy to the Ottoman Empire from 1886 to 1891, the United States from 1875 to 1880, and Spain from 1870 to 1871 and then again from 1883 to 1887. He was a recipient of the Order of Saints Maurice and Lazarus.

Biography
Son of Louis François and Mariette Cartannas, he married Natalia (Natividad) Terry. By royal decree of 30 March 1873, he was granted the title of Baron.

He graduated in Law at the University of Turin in 1857. From 1857 to 1860 he worked as a publicist.

The Count of Cavour sent him on a special mission to Paris on February 2, 1860. Hi appointment of secretary of second class at the Ministry of Foreign Affairs on October 24, 1860 marked the beginning a brilliant diplomatic career.

In 1893 he bought a vineyard in Rome, in Via Nomentana, and had its buildings renovated, thus creating what became Villa Blanc, one of the most beautiful villas in Rome, now located in the Municipality of Rome II.

Works
 Alberto Blanc, Collana Testi diplomatici vol. 4, Ministero degli Affari Esteri - Servizio Storico e Documentazione - Roma (PDF version)

Honors 
 Grand cordon of the Order of Saints Maurice and Lazarus – October 2, 1891

 Knight Grand Cross of the Order of the Crown of Italy

See also 
 Ministry of Foreign Affairs (Italy)
 Foreign relations of Italy

References

External links
 
 Alberto Blanc sul sito dell'Enciclopedia italiana, on treccani.it.

1835 births
1904 deaths
Politicians from Chambéry
Foreign ministers of Italy
Members of the Senate of the Kingdom of Italy
19th-century Italian politicians
20th-century Italian politicians
Ambassadors of Italy to the Ottoman Empire
Ambassadors of Italy to the United States
Ambassadors of Italy to Spain
Italian diplomats
Recipients of the Order of Saints Maurice and Lazarus
Ambassadors of Italy to Austria-Hungary